The Boys' Singles tournament of the 2012 Asian Junior Badminton Championships was held from July 3–7 in Gimcheon, South Korea. The defending champion of the last edition was Zulfadli Zulkiffli from Malaysia. The top seeded Sameer Verma of India had lost in the semifinals to third seeded Kento Momota of Japan, while the second seeded Shesar Hiren Rhustavito from Indonesia, lost to Yuki Kaneko of Japan in fourth round. Momota finally emerged as the champion after beat Malaysian player Soong Joo Ven in the finals with the score 21–13, 22–20.

Seeded

  Sameer Verma (semi-finals)
  Shesar Hiren Rhustavito (fourth round)
  Kento Momota (champion)
  Thammasin Sitthikom (second round)
  Khosit Phetpradab (quarter-finals)
  Soong Joo Ven (finals)
  C. Rohit Yadav (fourth round)
  Arief Gifar Ramadhan (third round)
  Ng Ka Long (quarter-finals)
  Wang Tzu-wei (quarter-finals)
  Panji Akbar Sudrajat (semi-finals)
  Pratul Joshi (second round)
  Tan Kian Meng (second round)
  Nonpakorn Nantatheero (fourth round)
  Heo Kwang-hee (third round)
  Jung Jae-wook (second round)

Draw

Finals

Top Half

Section 1

Section 2

Section 3

Section 4

Bottom Half

Section 5

Section 6

Section 7

Section 8

References

External links 
Main Draw

2012 Asian Junior Badminton Championships